"Bad News" is the 13th episode of the sixth season of the CBS sitcom How I Met Your Mother and their 125th episode overall. It aired January 3, 2011. TV Guide listed "Bad News" in its list of 2011's Top TV Episodes.

Plot
After several months of trying to conceive without success, Marshall and Lily are referred to a fertility expert. As they tell Ted the news at MacLaren's, Barney arrives and announces to Ted and Marshall's dismay that he needs a partner for a laser tag tournament.

Lily goes to her appointment with the fertility expert, Dr. John Stangel (Neil Patrick Harris), who looks exactly like Barney, save for a beard and dark brown hair. Lily assumes he is Barney in disguise and confronts Barney, but Marshall says they were together the whole day. He skeptically attends Lily's next appointment, but to his surprise, also becomes convinced that Stangel and Barney are the same person. Barney arrives, acknowledges the similarity, and leaves. After some misunderstandings, Lily finally sees Barney and Stangel in the same room together and is satisfied that they are two different people.

When Lily's tests reveal that she is extremely fertile, Marshall considers that his sperm may be the problem. He decides to get his sperm tested but is unable to produce a sperm sample at the doctor's office. He returns home to produce the sample, only to find that his parents have dropped by for a surprise visit. He reluctantly tells them his concerns about infertility, but they reassure him that they love him no matter what.

Meanwhile, Robin's new job at World Wide News has started badly. The network's lead anchor is her old Metro News 1 colleague Sandy Rivers. He tells the entire office that they had sex and tells increasingly embarrassing stories about her to her co-workers. After an especially humiliating day, Ted helps Robin confront Sandy at his apartment. Ted learns that Sandy is bald and wears a toupee; he snaps a picture, and tells Robin to show their office. At work the next day, Robin pulls out her old Robin Sparkles jacket, embracing the mockery and moving on rather than humiliating Sandy.

Having spent the entire day anticipating bad news, Marshall receives good news about his fertility from Stangel. While outside MacLaren's, he tries to call his father, but there is no answer. Lily pulls up in a taxi and tearfully informs Marshall that his father was rushed to the hospital after having a fatal heart attack. A shocked and grief-stricken Marshall weeps in Lily's arms, saying "I'm not ready for this."

Production
The twist ending of Marshall's father's death was the result of show co-creators and producers Carter Bays and Craig Thomas' desire to explore the issue of the characters experiencing such a loss. Bays said that "these kind of moments happen when you don't expect them. We wanted to shock the audience the way the characters were shocked. So much of what we love about the show is the relatability of it, and we try to create characters and stories that people see themselves in. As we've ticked off every milepost of young adulthood, sadly this is another one of those mileposts".
Jason Segel and Alyson Hannigan themselves were kept in the dark about the final scene. Segel said the original script had Lily saying she was pregnant, but on the scene's actual shooting day, the producers revealed that the scene would turn out differently. He and Hannigan worked out a plan wherein Segel would only know that his cue to react would be on Hannigan finishing her line with the word "it".  The scene was done in only one take.

Throughout the episode, numbers appear on ordinary objects counting down from 50 to 1. This is a countdown from the beginning of the episode to the eventual bad news, which is told right after the "1" is shown. As the final scene of the episode closes, a parking meter is in the background displaying a red "expired" state. The countdown was an idea taken from the 1988 film Drowning by Numbers; through the course of that film, the numbers 1 to 100 appear in order, sometimes seen in the background, and sometimes spoken by the film's characters. According to Bays, the countdown was used to give an early signal to the audience that something big was about to happen at the end of the episode.

Critical response

Donna Bowman of The A.V. Club gave the episode a C rating.

Robert Canning of IGN gave the episode a rating of 9.5 out of 10.

DeAnn Welker of Television Without Pity graded the episode an A.

Ratings 
This episode achieved the second highest ratings of season 6, bringing in 10.15 million viewers, just behind the episode "Last Words" which attracted 10.51 million viewers.

References

External links 
 

How I Met Your Mother (season 6) episodes
2011 American television episodes